The  occurred at around 14:00 on December 7, 1833. It struck with an epicenter in the Sea of Japan, off the coast of Yamagata Prefecture, Japan. A tsunami was triggered by the estimated  7.5–7.7 earthquake. One hundred and fifty people were killed and there was severe damage in the prefecture.

Tectonic setting
Japan is situated on a convergent boundary between the Pacific, Philippine Sea, Okhotsk and Amurian Plates. Along the island arc's east and southeast coast, subduction of the Pacific and Philippine Sea Plates occur at the Japan Trench and Nankai Trough, respectively. The west coast of Honshu, bordering the Sea of Japan, is a north–south trending convergent boundary. This boundary between the Amurian and Okhotsk Plates is thought to be an incipient subduction zone, consisting of eastward-dipping thrust faults. Convergent tectonics have been occurring in the region since the end of the Pliocene. Earthquakes and tsunamis are produced on thrust faults that form the boundary, with magnitudes in the range of 6.8–7.9. Major earthquakes and tsunamis along this boundary occurred in 1741, 1940, 1964, 1983 and 1993, although the origin of the 1741 tsunami remains open to debate.

Earthquake
The earthquake ruptured the convergent boundary faults of the eastern margin of the Sea of Japan. The rupture zone partially overlaps that of the 1964 earthquake which struck in the same area, although parts of the rupture area extended north. The earthquake had an estimated JMA magnitude of 7.5–7.7, similar to the 1964 earthquake, while the tsunami magnitude was 8.1. The JMA magnitude was calculated based on the seismic intensities recorded during the earthquake. A seismic gap exist between the rupture areas of the 1833 and 1983 earthquakes, which is capable of generating a magnitude 7.5 earthquake.

Tsunami

Although its seismic magnitude was estimated to be similar to the 1964 earthquake, it generated taller tsunami waves. It is thought to be one of the largest tsunami in the Sea of Japan. Large waves were reported along a  stretch of coastline. In Kisakata (Akita) and Ajigasawa (Aomori), waves  struck. The tsunami measured  in Izumozaki, Niigata. A tall wave measuring  washed onto Wajima, Ishikawa. Waves exceeding  was reported from Kamo to Fuya. Waves were described as "strong" in Tsuruoka. It reached Sakaiminato, Tottori, where it measured .

Impact
A total of 150 fatalities resulted. According to various sources, between 360 and 600 homes were washed away by the tsunami or destroyed in the shaking. Another 1,790 homes sustained partial destruction. In the Shonai region, 158 houses and 322 boats and ships were lost. An estimated 38 residents died in the tsunami. At Sado, 123 homes were destroyed. An additional 47 people died in Wajima, on the Noto Peninsula. Seismic intensity 5 extended  from Niigata to Akita to the Yamagata basin along the Mogami River. Shaking resulted in the partial destruction of Tsuruoka, Oyama, Makisone, Yosida, Okushinden, and Hironoshinden. Generally, damage in the region in proportion to the number of buildings was not great. The greatest damage was reported along the coast. Liquefaction was observed at Matsugasaki, Sado.

See also

List of earthquakes in Japan
List of historical earthquakes

References 

1833 in Japan
Earthquakes in Japan
Tsunamis in Japan
History of the Tōhoku region
History of Yamagata Prefecture
History of Niigata Prefecture
Shōnai, Yamagata
Sea of Japan
Earthquakes of the Edo period
History of Ishikawa Prefecture
1833 earthquakes
1833 tsunamis
Sado, Niigata
1832 disasters in Japan